Boxing on ABC refers to a series of boxing events that have been televised on the American Broadcasting Company. Many of these events aired under the Wide World of Sports banner which began on April 11, 1964 when challenger Muhammad Ali, then known as Cassius Clay, defeated champion Sonny Liston in the seventh round. ABC's final boxing card occurred on June 17, 2000.

History

Tomorrow's Boxing Champions (1949-1950)
The first incarnation of boxing telecasts on ABC was Tomorrow's Boxing Champions, which aired on Tuesday nights beginning in January 1949. Originating from Chicago, the program featured young, unranked fighters. Bob Elson did the blow-by-blow commentary. The series concluded in September 1950.

Meet the Champ (1952)
In January 1952, ABC premiered Meet the Champ, which was a collection of bouts involving members of the armed forces. The program aired on Thursday nights, with Wally Butterfield announcing.

Saturday Night Fights (1953-1955)
In 1953, Ray Arcel began promoting bouts on ABC. Unfortunately, shortly after arranging the fights for ABC, Arcel ran afoul of organized crime. The matches on ABC competed with other network television fights run by the International Boxing Club (IBC), who were reputed to have underworld ties.

Bill Stern did blow-by-blow commentary when Saturday Night Fights premiered. Come the fall, Jack Gregson took over from Stern.

Boxing from Ridgewood Grove and Motor City Boxing (1953)
In February 1953, ABC premiered Boxing from Ridgewood Grove. It aired on Tuesdays nights, with Jason Owen as the announcer in the first month and Bob Finnegan taking over until its cancellation in August. In March 1953, ABC brought Motor City Boxing from Detroit. The program would air for three months of Thursdays, with Don Wattrick at the providing commentary.

Boxing from Eastern Parkway (1954)
In May 1954, Boxing from Eastern Parkway moved from the DuMont Television Network to ABC. Tommy Logran handled the blow-by-blow commentary while occasionally being helped by Bob Finnegan and Fred Sayles. The series ended when ABC failed to renew its contract with the arena after picking up the rights to show fights at the International Boxing Club.

The Wednesday Night Fights (1955-1960)
After cancellation of Pabst Blue Ribbon Bouts on CBS in 1955, the series was picked up by ABC, renamed The Wednesday Night Fights, and continued until 1960.

Russ Hodges and Jack Drees both stayed with the show when it transferred from CBS. Hodges however, left in October 1955 and Drees was the only regular announcer for the five years it stayed on ABC.

Fight of the Week (1960-1963)
After NBC-TV's cancellation of The Gillette Cavalcade of Sports in the spring of 1960, ABC took over the prime time boxing program, although it was renamed Fight of the Week. Legendary boxing commentator Don Dunphy did the blow-by-blow description of the bouts, which took place on Saturday beginning in October 1960 and running through September 1963.

From there, the series moved to Friday nights, where it continued until ABC finally canceled prime time boxing after the bout of September 11, 1964, permanently ending 18 years of regularly scheduled prime time boxing on U.S. broadcast network television. One reason for the downturn of televised boxing occurred on Fight of the Week'''s the March 24, 1962 broadcast, when Emile Griffith defeated Benny "The Kid" Paret for the Welterweight Championship at New York's Madison Square Garden. Paret was carried from the ring unconscious, and died several days later as a result of his injuries that he had sustained in that bout.

Wide World of Sports (1964-2000)
Prior to the advent of Wide World of Sports, many major heavyweight boxing title matches were televised via "closed-circuit" (this generally meant that you had go to a movie theater to see it, pay a decent-sized amount of money to get it, and then watch it on a giant screen). Often, Wide World of Sports would show full-length replays of the fights a week or two later; these replays were usually called by Howard Cosell, who became one of the best-known (and possibly most controversial) sportscaster in American television history.

Still rebuilding a winning record after his first professional loss to Joe Frazier, Muhammad Ali faced Ken Norton on March 31, 1973, at the Sports Arena, San Diego, California. The fight was aired live on free TV in the United States via ABC.

Jerry Quarry retired for over two and a half years after his 1975 fight with Ken Norton fight. At around this time, Quarry signed a contract with ABC to be a boxing commentator. Quarry was very popular in this position, drawing the ire of Howard Cosell, who was being pushed out of some commentary work by Quarry. In mid-1977, a return match was being put together which would put Quarry in against a ranked heavyweight. The ranked heavyweight would be Italian Lorenzo Zanon. The match was to be televised on ABC, where Quarry was contracted. But both fighters signed to have the bout televised on CBS. When Quarry, who often negotiated his own fight contracts, signed the bout to CBS, he lost his ABC contract.

In 1976, ABC made a deal with promoter Don King and The Ring magazine to stage a tournament to determine the best fighter from the U.S. in each weight division. The tournament, dubbed the United States Boxing Championships was scheduled to begin on January 16, 1977 with ABC agreeing to finance the tournament with an investment of between $1.5 million and $2 million. Soon however, it determined that King was essentially using the tournament to sign the best fighters to exclusive contracts. To make matters worse, The Ring was falsifying records and inflating rankings as a means of getting a number of fighters into the tournament for King.

Sugar Ray Leonard's bout with Wilfred Benítez on November 30, 1979 marked the first time in the era of big-money sports events that a non-heavyweight fight would be carried as the main event on prime time television.

On November 15, 1984, ABC broadcast 'A Night of Gold', a card from promoter Dan Duva's 'Main Events', featuring no less than four gold medal winners (Mark Breland, Tyrell Biggs, Pernell Whitaker and Meldrick Taylor) from that year's Summer Olympic games, as well as those lagging behind in the runners-up spots.

In 1992, ABC announced plans to counterprogram the Winter Olympics on CBS with boxing, a sport at that point, seldom seen on network television. This particular boxing series was sponsored by Fruit of the Loom. ABC proceeded to forgo the typical $300,000 rights fees of the prior year, and instead, set a $75,000 limit and scheduled three consecutive Saturdays of action.

Notable bouts

Commentators

Don Chevrier
Dan Dierdorf - In April 1987, Dierdorf was hired by ABC to join Al Michaels and Frank Gifford on Monday Night Football broadcasts. He spent 12 seasons on Monday Night Football before resigning the post in early 1999. During his affiliation with ABC, Dierdorf also served as a blow-by-blow boxing commentator in 1989, beginning with Meldrick Taylor's first defense of his championship, served as a correspondent for the network's coverage of the 1988 Winter Olympics in Calgary, and called play-by-play of some College Football on ABC games in the early 1990s.
Keith Jackson - Though best known for his college football broadcasts, Jackson announced numerous other sports for ABC throughout his career, including Major League Baseball, NBA basketball, boxing, auto racing, PGA Tour golf, the USFL, and the Olympic Games. Jackson was a regular part of ABC's popular Wide World of Sports (WWOS), covering both popular sports and obscure events like wrist wrestling. He also handled WWOS' first coverage of boxer Sugar Ray Leonard at the North American Continental Boxing Championships on July 26, 1975, who Jackson called a young boxer to watch.
Jim Lampley - In 1974, while in graduate school, he was chosen along with Don Tollefson in what ABC called a talent hunt. ABC executives thought that Lampley's youthful looks would make him endearing to the college crowds they looked to attract for their college football games. At ABC, he covered such events as Major League Baseball and college basketball games, the 1986 and 1987 Indianapolis 500, the 1977 Monon Bell game between DePauw University and Wabash College, five Olympics, as well as the program Wide World of Sports.

Al Michaels - Michaels initially joined ABC as the back-up announcer on Monday Night Baseball in 1976. The following year, he was promoted to the network on a full-time basis. He became the lead announcer, replacing Keith Jackson in 1983. Over the next three decades, Michaels covered a wide variety of sports for ABC, including Major League Baseball, college football, college basketball, ice hockey, track and field events, horse racing, golf, boxing (such as the 1985 Marvin Hagler/Thomas Hearns fight), figure skating, road cycling, and many events of the Olympic Games as well as the Olympic trials.
Jerry Quarry
Chris Schenkel - ABC Sports hired Schenkel in 1965, and there he broadcast college football, Major League Baseball, NBA basketball, golf and tennis tournaments, boxing, auto racing, and the Summer and Winter Olympic Games.
Al Trautwig
Alex Wallau - He worked primarily on ABC's boxing coverage with announcer Howard Cosell. In 1986, after Cosell's retirement, Wallau became ABC's boxing analyst.  He was honored by the Boxing Writers Association of America as the top television boxing journalist in his first year.

Howard Cosell
Cosell rose to prominence in the early 1960s, covering boxer Muhammad Ali, beginning from the time he fought under his birth name, Cassius Clay. The two seemed to have an affinity despite their different personalities, and complemented each other in broadcasts. Cosell was one of the first sportscasters to refer to the boxer as Muhammad Ali after he changed his name, and supported him when he refused to be inducted into the military. Cosell called most of Ali's fights immediately before and after the boxer returned from his three-year exile in October 1970. Those fights were broadcast on taped delay usually a week after they were transmitted on closed circuit. However, Cosell did not call two of Ali's biggest fights, the Rumble in the Jungle in October 1974 and the first Ali–Joe Frazier bout in March 1971. Promoter Jerry Perenchio selected actor Burt Lancaster, who had never provided color commentary for a fight, to work the bout with longtime announcer Don Dunphy and former light-heavyweight champion Archie Moore. Cosell attended that fight as a spectator only. He would do a voiceover of that bout, when it was shown on ABC a few days before the second Ali-Frazier bout in January 1974.

Perhaps his most famous call took place in the fight between Joe Frazier and George Foreman for the World Heavyweight Championship in Kingston, Jamaica in 1973. When Foreman knocked Frazier to the mat the first of six times, roughly two minutes into the first round, Cosell yelled out:

His call of Frazier's first trip to the mat became one of the most quoted phrases in American sports broadcasting history. Foreman beat Frazier by a TKO in the second round to win the World Heavyweight Championship.

Cosell provided blow-by-blow commentary for ABC of some of boxing's biggest matches during the 1970s and the early 1980s, including Ken Norton's upset win over Ali in 1973 and Ali's defeat of Leon Spinks in 1978 recapturing the Heavyweight title for the third time. His signature toupee was unceremoniously knocked off in front of live ABC cameras when a scuffle broke out after a broadcast match between Scott LeDoux and Johnny Boudreaux. Cosell quickly retrieved his hairpiece and replaced it. During interviews in studio with Ali, the champion would tease and threaten to remove the hairpiece with Cosell playing along but never allowing it to be touched. On one of these occasions, Ali quipped, "Cosell, you're a phony, and that thing on your head comes from the tail of a pony."

With typical headline generating drama, Cosell abruptly ended his broadcast association with the sport of boxing while providing coverage for ABC for the heavyweight championship bout between Larry Holmes and Randall "Tex" Cobb on November 26, 1982. Halfway through the bout and with Cobb absorbing a beating, Cosell stopped providing anything more than rudimentary comments about round number and the participants punctuated with occasional declarations of disgust during the 15 rounds. He declared shortly after the fight to a national television audience that he had broadcast his last professional boxing match.

In the 1976 Summer Games in Montreal, and the 1984 games in Los Angeles, Cosell was the main voice for boxing. Sugar Ray Leonard won the gold medal in his light welterweight class at Montreal, beginning his meteoric rise to a world professional title a few years later, and Cosell became close to Leonard, during this period, announcing many of his fights.

Cancelled 2007 card

Seven years after ABC's last boxing card, they were scheduled to broadcast a card from Boardwalk Hall in Atlantic City, New Jersey on April 22, 2007. The card would've featured former light heavyweight champion Antonio Tarver facing off against Elvir Muriqi. Promoter Joe DeGuardia of Star Boxing had been working on the time buy deal (in other words, DeGuardia was not paid a licensing fee by ABC, but rather bought an hour of time from the network). The production would've been handled by ABC's sister company, ESPN with Friday Night Fights commentators Joe Tessitore and Teddy Atlas. The bout was ultimately scrapped amid rumors that Tarver would not be able to make the 175 pound weight limit.

Premier Boxing Champions (2015)
On March 19, 2015, ESPN announced that Friday Night Fights would air for the final time on May 22, 2015, covering the finals of the 2015 Boxcino tournament. The network announced that it had reached a multi-year deal with Al Haymon's Premier Boxing Champions to broadcast 11 events per-year on the main ESPN network, primarily on Saturday nights, and an afternoon event on ABC. Joe Tessitore and Teddy Atlas were carried over to serve as hosts. ESPN is one of several major broadcasters that airs fights through the promotion, which also includes NBC, CBS, their respective cable sports networks, as well as Spike.

See alsoABC Wide World of Sports BoxingBoxing on the radio
Olympics on ABC commentators#Summer Olympics
The Super Fight - Debates subsequently took place over the next three decades as to whether at least one print of film had survived. It was cited that many theaters had continued to play the film long after January 20, 1970, and was also noted that the film had one airing on ABC's Wide World of Sports'' in 1970, and another on CBS late night in 1977, with many more broadcasts alleged throughout.

References

External links
Wide World Boxing Milestones and Highlights
Wide World of Sports Highlights -- 1960s
Wide World of Sports Highlights -- 1970s
Wide World of Sports Highlights -- 1980s
Wide World of Sports Highlights -- 1990s
Wide World of Sports – ImaSportsphile
ABC News - Boxing
BOXING ON TV

Wide World of Sports (American TV series)
ABC Sports
ABC
American Broadcasting Company original programming
1950s American television series
1960s American television series
1970s American television series
1980s American television series
1990s American television series
2000s American television series
1949 American television series debuts
2000 American television series endings